Donald A. Abraham (September 26, 1930 – July 24, 1978) was a Democratic member of the Pennsylvania House of Representatives.

References

Democratic Party members of the Pennsylvania House of Representatives
1978 deaths
1930 births
20th-century American politicians